

Lady of Guise

Non hereditary, 950–?

Elder House of Guise, ?–1185

House of Avesnes, 1185–1244

House of Châtillon, 1244–1404

House of Valois-Anjou, 1404–1417

Countess of Guise

House of Valois-Anjou, 1417–1425

House of Luxembourg, 1425–1472

House of Valois-Anjou, 1444–1481

Reverted to the Crown 1481–1491

House of Armagnac, 1491–1520
None, although its only Count was betrothed to Françoise of Alençon

House of Guise, 1520–1528

Duchess of Guise

House of Guise, 1528–1688

House of Wittelsbach, 1688–1723
None

House of Bourbon, 1709–1830

Afterwards, the title was extinguished and no longer bestowed.  It returned to the royal domain.  Louis Henry though left his estate to his godson, Prince Henri, Duke of Aumale.  He was bestowed with the personal title of Duke of Guise by Louis-Philippe I, King of the French, his grandfather, in 1847.

See also
List of consorts of Maine
List of Angevin consorts
Duchess of Nemours
Duchess of Lorraine
Duchess of Mayenne
Duchess of Aumale
Duchess of Elbeuf
Princess of Joinville
Princess of Condé
Duchess of Orléans

 
French duchesses
Guise
Guise
Guise, List of royal consorts of